The R299 road is a regional road in Ireland linking the N4 and R280 roads in County Leitrim.

See also
Roads in Ireland

References

Regional roads in the Republic of Ireland
Roads in County Leitrim